NICE – Network of InterCultural Exchange is a German-Argentine cooperation, which applies itself to the educational and cultural exchange between Europe and Argentina. Its goal is to support students in organising long term stays (e.g. internships) in Argentina, to acquire among work experience soft skills as intercultural flexibility.

History 
NICE was founded in 2004 in Córdoba, where it is headquartered to this day. The foundation was triggered by the discontentment of the founder members with the improvable offer of the internship intermediation and mentoring in Argentina, which they got to know on site as trainees.
The fascination for the South American continent and the emotional need to introduce the vitality and the cultural heritage of Argentina to interested and open-minded students led quickly to an intercultural network, which is manifested in the multilingualism of the NGO today.

Objective 
NICE is aimed at the promotion of the international cultural and knowledge exchange by honorary general counselling about Argentina, but mainly by individual intermediation of internships and volunteerings, offering of Spanish courses at the integrated language school and the organization of accommodations with locals. In this way the students shall be allowed to get to know the everyday (working) life and the lived reality of Argentina as their own live and consequently strengthen not only their professional but also their intercultural competence.

External links 
 Review of NICE
 English website of NICE
 German website of NICE
 French website of NICE
 NICE-Language School
 Córdoba, Argentina

Education in Argentina
Education in Germany
Student exchange